The WTA rankings are the ratings defined by the Women's Tennis Association, introduced in November 1975.

Iga Świątek is the current world No. 1.

Ranking method
The WTA rankings are based on a rolling 52-week, cumulative system. A player's ranking is determined by her results at a maximum of 16 tournaments for singles and 11 for doubles  and points are awarded based on how far a player advances in a tournament. The basis for calculating a player's ranking are those tournaments that yield the highest ranking points during the rolling 52-week period with the condition that they must include points from the 4 Grand Slams, the 4 Premier Mandatory tournaments and the WTA Finals. In addition, for Top 20 players, their best two results at Premier 5 tournaments will also count. Up until 2016, the WTA also distributed ranking points, for singles players only, who competed at the Summer Olympics. However, this has since been discontinued. The computer that calculates the ranking is nicknamed "Medusa".

In order to appear on the WTA rankings, players must earn ranking points in at least three tournaments, or a minimum of 10 singles ranking points or 10 doubles ranking points in one or more tournaments.

The points distribution for tournaments in 2021 is shown below. Points earned in 2013 were a little different in some cases and retained their value until they expired after 52 weeks.

S = singles players, D = doubles teams, Q = qualification players.
* Assumes undefeated Round Robin match record.
"+H" indicates that Hospitality is provided.

Note that if a player or team receives one or more byes and then loses their first match of the tournament, they will only receive points for the first round of that tournament.  For example, if a player receives a bye in R64 and then loses her match in R32, she will only receive points for R64 despite having advanced (via bye) to R32.  Similarly, if a player or team withdraws from their first match after receiving a bye, they will not be awarded any points for that tournament.

In ITF tournaments, the main draw is normally 32 for singles and 16 for doubles.  Losers in the first round of doubles will receive points equal to that shown in the R32 column above. For subsequent rounds (quarter-finals onwards) the points are the same as for singles.

Current rankings

Points breakdown

Number one ranked players

The following is a chronological list of players who have achieved the number one position in singles since the WTA began producing computerized rankings on November 3, 1975:

Last update:

Year-end number one players

The year-end number one player is the player at the head of the WTA rankings following the completion of the final tournament of the calendar year.

Singles

Doubles

Year-end Top 10 
★ indicates player's highest year-end ranking

Players with highest career rank 2–5
The following is a list of singles players who were ranked world No. 5 or higher but not No. 1 since November 3, 1975:

Players with highest career rank 6–10
The following is a list of players who were ranked world No. 6 to No.10 in the period since the 1975 introduction of the WTA rankings.

Consecutive weeks in the Top 10
The below lists the singles players with the most consecutive weeks in the top 10 of the WTA world rankings:

* The 20 weeks period between 23 March 2020 and 10 August 2020, when the WTA Ranking was not published due to COVID pandemic, was not counted.
Last update:

Number 1 in singles and doubles

At the same time
The below lists the players who were ranked number 1 in both singles and doubles at the same time:

At any time
The below lists the players who were ranked number 1 in both singles and doubles at any time in their career. Date in bold indicates date the feat was achieved:

Year End No. 1
The below lists the players who finished the year ranked number 1 in both singles and doubles:

Navratilova also finished number 1 in either ranking list for 8 consecutive seasons: 1982-83 - Singles, 1984 - Singles & Doubles, 1985- Singles, 1986- Singles & Doubles, 1987-89 - Doubles.

No other player has managed to finish number 1 in singles and in doubles (same or different years).

See also
List of WTA number 1 ranked singles tennis players
List of WTA number 1 ranked doubles tennis players
World number 1 ranked female tennis players
Top ten ranked female tennis players
Top ten ranked female tennis players (1921–1974)
WTA Tour records
WTA Awards
Lists of tennis records and statistics
ATP rankings
Current tennis rankings

Notes and references

External links
WTA rankings
WTA Tour All-Time Records

Rankings
WTA
Sports world rankings
Women's Tennis Association